The Nepal gray langur (Semnopithecus schistaceus) is a gray langur endemic to the Himalayas in Nepal, far southwestern Tibet, northern India, northern Pakistan, Bhutan and possibly Afghanistan. Its easternmost limit in India is Buxa Tiger Reserve in northern West Bengal, at least up to the Rydak river.
 
The Nepal gray langur is both terrestrial and arboreal and eats leaves. At , the heaviest langur ever recorded was a male Nepal gray langur.

References

Nepal gray langur
Fauna of the Himalayas
Mammals of Afghanistan
Mammals of Bhutan
Mammals of China
Mammals of India
Mammals of Nepal
Mammals of Pakistan
Monkeys in India
Fauna of Sikkim
Nepal gray langur
Taxa named by Brian Houghton Hodgson